Frank McLoughlin was an Irish footballer who played as a midfielder for Fordsons F.C. and its successor Cork F.C.

He also played twice for Ireland against Belgium and Spain.

References

External links
 

Republic of Ireland association footballers
Association football midfielders
Republic of Ireland international footballers
Ireland (FAI) international footballers
League of Ireland players
Year of birth missing